Eupithecia angulata is a moth in the family Geometridae. It was described by David Stephen Fletcher in 1951 and is found in Ethiopia.

References

Endemic fauna of Ethiopia
Moths described in 1951
angulata
Insects of Ethiopia
Moths of Africa